Catterick Crusaders are a rugby league team based in Catterick, North Yorkshire. They play in the North East Division of the Rugby League Conference.

They have 8 different age groups
-Open Age
-U'16's
-U'14's
-U'12's
-U'12's
-U'10's
-U'8's
-Cubs -6

History

Northallerton Stallions were formed at a meeting in The Standard Inn in Northallerton on Wednesday 7 November 2007. The idea of a club in Northallerton had been first discussed during a trip to the Super League Grand Final in October 2007. 

The Stallions joined the Yorkshire Division of the 2008 Rugby League Conference. Pre-season training for the club’s inaugural campaign began at Brompton Lodge on 5 February 2008 following an open evening at The Standard the previous week. The club attracted players from Northallerton, Ripon, Leyburn, Thirsk and Harrogate the initial vision of a Hambleton club started to materialize.

In 2009, the club joined the North East Division of the Conference. In the club's second season, they continued to improve and reached the semi-finals of the York International 9s.

June 2010 saw the club move across town to Ainderby Lesiure Park, Romanby to increase the visibility and the profile of the club and by doing so increase local involvement from players, volunteers and establish a junior section. Jase Grant MBE came on board as head coach; under his guidance the Stallions went on to become winners of the North East Plate.

The club entered an open-age team in the CMS Yorkshire league Division 3 winter league. Due to ground been unavailable at Romanby, the club secured the facilities at the Garrison Pitches, Caterick Garrison.

In 2011 the club rebranded as North Yorkshire Stallions to go with their relocation to Catterick before becoming the Catterick Crusaders after the 2012 season.

Juniors

Northallerton Stallions' juniors compete as Northallerton Broncos in the North East Junior League.

Club honours

 RLC North East Plate: 2010
 RLC North East Division: 2011

External links

 Official website 

Rugby League Conference teams
BARLA teams
Sport in North Yorkshire
Rugby clubs established in 2007
Rugby league teams in North Yorkshire